Bonnie Gordon (born March 27, 1986) is an American actress and singer residing in Los Angeles, California.

Background and early years 
Bonnie is the granddaughter of U.S. Army Corporal Walter Scott "Smokey" Gordon Jr. of Easy Company, 2nd Battalion, 506th Parachute Infantry Regiment, 101st Airborne during World War II. Her grandfather was portrayed in the HBO miniseries Band of Brothers by Ben Caplan.

Bonnie attended Northwestern State University in Natchitoches, but shortly after Hurricane Katrina, she relocated to Orlando, Florida to work at Disney World, before joining a Romani equestrian show caravan and touring Renaissance festivals in the upper Midwest as their barker.

Career

Acting 
Early in her career, Bonnie was in the cast of the Orlando and later the Las Vegas production of Tony n' Tina's Wedding, and was also a cast member of Star Trek: The Experience in Las Vegas. She was also a regular on Geek and Sundry's Star Trek series, Shield of Tomorrow in 2018, as Lt. Lark Sage. And later on she portrayed the chief medical officer of the USS Ross, Doctor M'Qrell, on the Star Trek Actual Play series Clear Skies with the Streampunks.

In June 2022, Bonnie performed as Lavender Terra in the world stage premiere of Teaching A Robot To Love at the Hollywood Fringe Festival.

Gaming
Bonnie is an avid gamer and professional TTRPG player who has played in campaigns on multiple Twitch channels. In 2014, Bonnie participated in the ABC television reality series The Quest, as "Paladin Bonnie." Although a fan favorite, she was "banished" in episode 8th, placing 5th among the competitors.

Music
After her stint on The Quest, in 2014 Bonnie formed the nerd parody band Library Bards with her friend (and fellow reality TV star) Xander Jeanneret. Their first song, "Gandalf" (a parody of Taylor Swift's "Shake it Off") was created in collaboration with the fan site theonering.net, and debuted before the final installment of the Hobbit films. The song debuted as #1 in the comedy genre in Los Angeles on the music website ReverbNation, #2 nationally, and #3 globally in December 2014. The Library Bards continue to hold a top spot in the Comedy genre in Los Angeles, and have been featured on CBS' Celebrity Name Game, SyFy's Geeks Who Drink and on the legendary Dr. Demento Show.

Bonnie also performed the English version of the ending theme for the video game, Fire Emblem Echoes: Shadows of Valentia.

Voice acting
As a voice actress, Bonnie is known for voicing such characters as Rainbow Mika in the video game Street Fighter V, Silque in Fire Emblem Heroes and Fire Emblem Echoes: Shadows of Valentia, Shikou Soujin, from the English dub of the anime series Ikki Tousen: Xtreme Xecutor, Bounce Man from Mega Man 11; Eva from Code Vein, and Yū Abiko (Biko) in Muhyo & Roji's Bureau of Supernatural Investigation, among others. She also voiced multiple characters on Cartoon Network’s Mighty Magiswords.

Bonnie recently landed the role as the Ship's Computer on Paramount+ and Nickelodeon's new series, Star Trek: Prodigy. She was hired for the role after doing scratch vocals for the characters of Gwyn and Janeway. The series has already been renewed for a second season.

Other activities
When not doing voiceover work or touring with one of three bands she is currently in, Bonnie might be found performing at Hollywood's famous Magic Castle, where she has been a performing member for the past 13 years.

References

External links
 

1986 births
Living people
American voice actresses
Comedians from Los Angeles County
Nerd-folk musicians
American parodists
Parody musicians
People from Lafayette, Louisiana
21st-century American singers
21st-century American women singers
Participants in American reality television series